The Third Woidke cabinet is the current state government of Brandenburg, sworn in on 20 November 2019 after Dietmar Woidke was elected as Minister-President of Brandenburg by the members of the Landtag of Brandenburg. It is the 9th Cabinet of Brandenburg.

It was formed after the 2019 Brandenburg state election by the Social Democratic Party (SPD), Christian Democratic Union (CDU), and Alliance 90/The Greens (GRÜNE). Excluding the Minister-President, the cabinet comprises ten ministers. Five are members of the SPD, three are members of the CDU, and two are members of the Greens.

Formation 

The previous cabinet was a coalition government of the SPD and The Left led by Minister-President Dietmar Woidke of the SPD.

The election took place on 1 September 2019, and resulted in significant losses for both governing parties. The opposition CDU also suffered losses, while the AfD became the second largest party and the BVB/FW narrowly passed the 5% threshold.

Overall, the incumbent coalition lost its majority. Two new coalitions were considered: a red-red-green coalition of the SPD, Left, and Greens, and a Kenya coalition of the SPD, CDU, and Greens. Of these, the former was considered more likely as it would represent a less radical departure from the outgoing government. Likewise, the Left and Greens shared a greater policy overlap with the SPD compared to the CDU. On the other hand, the Kenya coalition would have a safer majority of 50 seats compared to 45 for the red-red-green coalition, which held only a one-seat majority.

On 19 September, Minister-President Woidke announced that the SPD would seek coalition negotiations with the CDU and Greens. Discussions began on 23 September, and the three parties presented their coalition agreement on 24 October. It was subsequently approved by the SPD party congress with 113 votes in favour, no votes against and one abstention on 15 November. The CDU carried out an advisory survey of party members, who voted 85.7% in support. The agreement was subsequently approved by the party congress on 16 November. The Greens held a membership ballot to review the pact, the results of which were announced on 18 November; with a turnout of 59%, it received 90.8% approval.

Woidke was elected as Minister-President by the Landtag on 20 November, winning 47 votes out of 87 cast.

Composition

External links

References 

Politics of Brandenburg
State governments of Germany
Cabinets established in 2019
2019 establishments in Germany